Saori Sarina Ohno (born 1970 in Tokyo, Japan) is pianist who was raised in Germany.

Education
Ohno began playing the piano at the age of four. At sixteen, she entered the Staatliche Hochschule für Musik und Darstellende Kunst in Stuttgart, Germany, as a student of Lieselotte Gierth and Gerd Lohmeyer. After receiving her master's degree, she continued her studies at Indiana University where she received an Artist Diploma as a student of Menahem Pressler. She also obtained a Graduate Chamber Music Diploma from the University of Wisconsin–Milwaukee. In 2005, she received her doctoral degree from the Graduate Center of the City University of New York. Her doctoral dissertation was titled "The Piano Chamber Music of Maurice Ravel." Additionally, she studied with Rita Sloan, Joseph Kalichstein and Lev Natochenny.

Awards
Ohno was the winner of the German National Youth Competition Jugend musiziert in 1986, the 1992 E. Nakamichi Piano Competition in Aspen, the 1994 Indiana University Piano Competition and won top prizes at the prestigious Fischoff and Coleman Chamber Music Competitions.

Style
Ohno concertizes extensively as a soloist, recitalist and chamber musician in Europe, the United States, Japan and Taiwan.

She is on the faculty of Shobi University and Shobi Music College.

In 2010, she released her first CD of piano music by Maurice Ravel (WWCC-7662). Her second CD features piano compositions by Robert Schumann. Both albums received critical acclaim and were awarded a "Special Selection" by Recording Arts Magazine (レコード芸術 特選盤)

External links
www.saoriohno.com

1970 births
German classical pianists
German women pianists
Women classical pianists
Indiana University alumni
Japanese classical pianists
Japanese women pianists
Living people
State University of Music and Performing Arts Stuttgart alumni
University of Wisconsin–Milwaukee alumni
21st-century Japanese women musicians
21st-century classical pianists
21st-century women pianists